The Jobseekers Act 1995 (c 18) is an Act of Parliament of the United Kingdom, which empowers the government to provide unemployment income insurance, or "Jobseeker's Allowance" while people are looking for work. 

In its current form, jobseeker's allowance is available without any means testing (i.e. inquiry into people's income or assets) for people who have paid into the National Insurance fund in at least the last two years. People can claim this for up to 182 days. After this, one's income and assets are means tested. 

If people do not have enough in National Insurance Contributions (e.g. because they have just left school or university), the other kind of Jobseeker's allowance, income-based, is being phased out and replaced by universal credit, started by the Welfare Reform Act 2012. This requires means-testing.

Contents
Part I, sections 1 to 25 concern the Jobseeker’s Allowance.

Part II, sections 26 to 29 concern Back to Work Schemes.

Part III, sections 30 to 41 are Miscellaneous and Supplemental provisions.

See also
UK labour law
Unemployment in the United Kingdom
Universal credit

Unemployment in the United Kingdom
United Kingdom labour law